Below is a list of the seasons that the Sydney Roosters have competed in since 1908.

Seasons

See also

References

External links

 
Australian rugby league lists
Sydney-sport-related lists
Australian rugby league club seasons